David Thornton may refer to:
 David Thornton (musician) (born 1978), British euphonium player
 David Thornton (actor) (born 1953), American actor
 David Thornton (American football) (born 1978), linebacker for the Tennessee Titans
 David F. Thornton (1924–2008), member of the Senate of Virginia